Rose Elisabeth Benjamin (7 December 1908 – 29 March 1999) was an English architect. She was of the first generation of women who trained as architects in the 1920s and 1930s. She designed a small number of modernist buildings and contributed towards the development of avant-garde architecture in Britain.

Early life 
Benjamin was born in Hendon, Middlesex, the only child of Jewish parents, Elizabeth Abadi, a suffragette, and Alfred Benjamin, a businessman. 
She was educated at St Paul's School in Hammersmith. In 1925, she spent six months in Paris and following this briefly attended art school in St John's Wood. She attended the Architectural Association from 1927 and graduated in 1932. During her time at the Architectural Association, Benjamin encountered Godfrey Samuel (1927–32), a fellow student and a later founder- member of Tecton, and she also worked for Edwin Lutyens' office during her year out.

Career 
First working from home in Golders Green and then in her office 42 South Molton Street in London, Benjamin designed three modern houses that are known for their freshness. In Highgate, No 1 Fitzroy Park was rebuilt for Dr Edith Summerskill as a vehicle for self-presentation and Labour Party politics.

References 

1908 births
1999 deaths
British women architects
Architects from London
Alumni of the Architectural Association School of Architecture